Andrew Newell Wyeth (July 12, 1917 – January 16, 2009) was an American visual artist, primarily a realist painter, working predominantly in a regionalist style. He was one of the best-known U.S. artists of the middle 20th century.

In his art, Wyeth's favorite subjects were the land and people around him, both in his hometown of Chadds Ford, Pennsylvania, and at his summer home in Cushing, Maine. Wyeth often said: "I paint my life." One of the best-known images in 20th-century American art is his tempera painting Christina's World, currently in the collection of the Museum of Modern Art in New York City, which was painted in 1948, when Wyeth was 31 years old.

Biography

Childhood
Andrew was the youngest of the five children of illustrator and artist N.C. (Newell Convers) Wyeth and his wife, Carolyn Bockius Wyeth.  He was born July 12, 1917, on the 100th anniversary of Henry David Thoreau's birth. Due to N.C.'s fond appreciation of Henry David Thoreau, he found this both coincidental and exciting.  N.C. was an attentive father, fostering each of the children's interests and talents. The family was close, spending time reading together, taking walks, fostering "a closeness with nature" and developing a feeling for Wyeth family history.

Andrew was home-tutored because of his frail health. Like his father, the young Wyeth read and appreciated the poetry of Robert Frost and the writings of Henry David Thoreau and studied their relationships with nature. Music and movies also heightened his artistic sensitivity. One major influence, discussed at length by Wyeth himself, was King Vidor's The Big Parade (1925). He claimed to have seen the film, which depicted family dynamics similar to his own, "a hundred-and-eighty-times" and believed it had the greatest influence on his work. Vidor later made a documentary, The Metaphor, where he and Wyeth discuss the influence of the film on his paintings, including Winter 1946, Snow Flurries, Portrait of Ralph Kline and Afternoon Flight of a Boy up a Tree.

Wyeth's father was the only teacher that he had. Due to being schooled at home, he led both a sheltered life and one that was "obsessively focused". Wyeth recalled of that time: "Pa kept me almost in a jail, just kept me to himself in my own world, and he wouldn't let anyone in on it. I was almost made to stay in Robin Hood's Sherwood Forest with Maid Marion and the rebels."

N.C. Wyeth was an illustrator known for his work in magazines, posters and advertisements. He created illustrations for books such as Treasure Island and The Last of the Mohicans. By the 1920s, Wyeth senior had become a celebrity, and the family often had celebrities as guests, such as F. Scott Fitzgerald and Mary Pickford.  The home bustled with creative activity and competition. N.C. and Carolyn's five children were all talented. Henriette Wyeth Hurd, the eldest, became a painter of portraits and still lifes. Carolyn, the second child, was also a painter. Nathaniel Wyeth, the third child, was a successful inventor. Ann was a musician at a young age and became a composer as an adult.  Andrew was the youngest child.

N.C. Wyeth's guidance
Wyeth started drawing at a young age. He was a draftsman before he could read.  By the time he was a teenager, his father brought him into his studio for the only art lessons he ever had and inspired his son's love of rural landscapes, sense of romance, and artistic traditions.  Although creating illustrations was not a passion he wished to pursue, Wyeth produced illustrations under his father's name while in his teens.

With his father's guidance, he mastered figure study and watercolor, and later learned egg tempera from his brother-in-law Peter Hurd. He studied art history on his own, admiring many masters of Renaissance and American painting, especially Winslow Homer.

N.C. also fostered an inner self-confidence to follow one's own talents without thought of how the work is received.  N.C. wrote in a letter to Wyeth in 1944:

The great men Thoreau, Goethe, Emerson, Tolstoy forever radiate a sharp sense of that profound requirement of an artist, to fully understand that consequences of what he creates are unimportant.  Let the motive for action be in the action itself and not in the event. I know from my own experience that when I create with any degree of strength and beauty I have no thought of consequences.  Anyone who creates for effect—to score a hit—does not know what he is missing!

In the same letter, N.C. correlates being a great person with being a great painter:  To be a great artist, he described, requires emotional depth, an openness to look beyond self to the subject, and passion. A great painting then is one that enriches and broadens one's perspective.

In October 1945, his father and his three-year-old nephew, Newell Convers Wyeth II (b. 1941), were killed when their car stalled on railroad tracks near their home and was struck by a train. Wyeth referred to his father's death as a formative emotional event in his artistic career, in addition to being a personal tragedy. Shortly afterwards, Wyeth's art consolidated into his mature and enduring style.

Marriage and children
On May 15, 1940, Wyeth married Betsy James, whom he met in 1939 in Maine.  Christina Olson, who was to become the model for Christina's World, met Wyeth through an introduction by Betsy.  His wife, Betsy, had an influence on Andrew as strong as that of his father, such that N.C. Wyeth began to resent her. She played an important role managing his career. She was once quoted as saying, "I am a director and I had the greatest actor in the world."
Their first child, Nicholas, was born in 1943, followed by James ("Jamie") three years later. Wyeth painted portraits of both children (Nicholas of his older son and Faraway of his younger son).

His son Jamie Wyeth followed his father's and grandfather's footsteps, becoming the third generation of Wyeth artists. Andrew would be the role model and teacher to his son Jamie that his father, N.C., had been to him. The artistic history is told in James H. Duff's An American Vision: Three Generations of Wyeth Art.

Death
On January 16, 2009, Andrew Wyeth died in his sleep in Chadds Ford, Pennsylvania, after a brief illness. He was 91 years old.
His wife Betsy died on April 21, 2020, at the age of 98.

Work
In 1937, at age twenty, Wyeth had his first one-man exhibition of watercolors at the Macbeth Gallery in New York City. The entire inventory of paintings sold out, and his life path seemed certain. His style was different from his father's: more spare, "drier," and more limited in color range. He stated his belief that "the great danger of the Pyle school is picture-making." He did some book illustrations in his early career, but not to the extent that N.C. Wyeth did.

Wyeth was a visual artist, primarily classified as a realist painter, like Winslow Homer or Thomas Eakins. In a Life magazine article in 1965, Wyeth said that although he was thought of as a realist, he thought of himself as an abstractionist: "My people, my objects breathe in a different way: there's another core—an excitement that's definitely abstract. My God, when you really begin to peer into something, a simple object, and realize the profound meaning of that thing—if you have an emotion about it, there's no end." Some feel Wyeth's work went against modernist ideals by embodying middle-class values, but this caused conversations about his work to extend beyond painting to social class.

He worked predominantly in a regionalist style. In his art, Wyeth's favorite subjects were the land and people around him, both in his hometown of Chadds Ford, Pennsylvania, and at his summer home in Cushing, Maine.

Dividing his time between Pennsylvania and Maine, Wyeth maintained a realist painting style for over seventy years. He gravitated to several identifiable landscape subjects and models. His solitary walks were the primary means of inspiration for his landscapes. He developed an extraordinary intimacy with the land and sea and strove for a spiritual understanding based on history and unspoken emotion. He typically created dozens of studies on a subject in pencil or loosely brushed watercolor before executing a finished painting, either in watercolor, drybrush (a watercolor style in which the water is squeezed from the brush), or egg tempera.

Christina Olson and the Olson Farm
It was at the Olson farm in Cushing, Maine, that he painted Christina's World (1948). Perhaps his best known work, it depicts his neighbor, Christina Olson, sprawled on a dry field facing her house in the distance. Wyeth was inspired by Christina, who, crippled from (undiagnosed) Charcot–Marie–Tooth disease, a genetic polyneuropathy, and unable to walk, spent most of her time at home.<ref>' 'Wyeth:Christina's World, Hoptman, Laura, 2012, MOMA</ref>

The Olson house has been preserved and renovated to match its appearance in Christina's World. It is open to the public as a part of the Farnsworth Art Museum. After being introduced to the Olsons by Betsy James, Wyeth built a friendship with the siblings and was soon allowed full roam of the farm and house where he did a number of works and studies of the Olson House and property. Wyeth created nearly 300 drawings, watercolors and tempera paintings at Olson's from 1937 to the late 1960s. Examples of such works are Olson House (1939) and Wind from the Sea (1947).

Because of Wyeth's profile, the property was designated a National Historic Landmark in June 2011.

Kuerner Farm
In the early 1930s, Wyeth began painting Anna and Karl Kuerner, his neighbors in Chadds Ford. Like the Olsons, the Kuerners and their farm were one of Wyeth's most important subjects for nearly 50 years.  As a teenager, Wyeth would walk the hills of the Kuerner Farm. Soon, he became close friends with Karl and Anna. Eventually, they invited Wyeth into their house. Inside, Wyeth documented the Kuerners, their home, and their life.

Wyeth stated about the Kuerner Farm, "I didn't think it a picturesque place. It just excited me, purely abstractly and purely emotionally."

Chadds Ford contained a small enclave of African-Americans known as "Little Africa." The community settled around Mother Archie's Church, a Quaker schoolhouse converted to a house of worship. Andrew Wyeth painted the church in several landscapes during its active period, and the abandoned building walls appear in Ring Road (1985). African-American residents of Little Africa appear as recurring models for Wyeth's paintings. 

The Kuerner Farm is available to tour through the Brandywine River Museum, as is the nearby N. C. Wyeth House and Studio; in 2011, the farm was declared a National Historic Landmark, based on its association with Wyeth.

Helga paintings

In 1986, extensive coverage was given to the revelation of a series of 247 studies of the German-born Helga Testorf, whom Wyeth met while she was attending to Karl Kuerner at his farm. Wyeth painted her over the period 1971–85 without the knowledge of either his wife or Helga's husband, John Testorf. Helga, a caregiver with nursing experience,  had never modeled before but quickly became comfortable with the long periods of posing, during which he observed and painted her in intimate detail. The Helga pictures are not an obvious psychological study of the subject, but more an extensive study of her physical landscape set within Wyeth's customary landscapes. She is nearly always portrayed as unsmiling and passive; yet, within those deliberate limitations, Wyeth manages to convey subtle qualities of character and mood, as he does in many of his best portraits. This extensive study of one subject in differing contexts and emotional states is unique in American art.

In 1986, Philadelphia publisher and millionaire Leonard E.B. Andrews (1925–2009) purchased almost the entire collection, preserving it intact. Wyeth had already given a few Helga paintings to friends, including the famous Lovers, which had been given as a gift to Wyeth's wife.

The works were exhibited at the National Gallery of Art in 1987 and in a nationwide tour. There was extensive criticism of both the 1987 exhibition and the subsequent tour.  The show was "lambasted" as an "absurd error" by John Russell and an "essentially tasteless endeavor" by Jack Flam, coming to be viewed by some people as "a traumatic event for the museum." The curator, Neil Harris, labeled the show "the most polarizing National Gallery exhibition of the late 1980s," himself admitting concern over "the voyeuristic aura of the Helga exhibition."

The tour was criticized after the fact because, after it ended, the pictures' owner sold his entire cache to a Japanese company, a transaction characterized by Christopher Benfey as  "crass."

In a 2007 interview, when Wyeth was asked if Helga was going to be present at his 90th birthday party, he said "Yeah, certainly. Oh, absolutely," and went on to say, "She's part of the family now. I know it shocks everyone. That's what I love about it. It really shocks 'em."

Other main works
 Inspired by Winslow Homer's watercolors, Wyeth painted an impressionistic watercolor, Coot Hunter, about 1933.  There he experimented with the "fleeting effects of light and movement".
 Public Sale (1943, Philadelphia Museum of Art), is one of his first tempera paintings.
 After N.C. Wyeth's death, his work began to take on a melancholic tone.  Wyeth painted Winter 1946 (1946, North Carolina Museum of Art, Raleigh, 1946), which depicts a neighbor boy, Allan Lynch, running aimlessly down a bleak hill, his hand reaching out. The location of the work was the other side of the hill where his father had died and represented the unsettling, free-falling sense of loss.
 Painted in 1947, Wind from the Sea depicts a breeze entering a window on the upper floor of the Olson house. It is an example of non-figurative portraiture and was a favorite of the poet Robert Frost.Adam (1963, Brandywine Museum), A tempera painting of a neighbor, Adam Johnson, who lived near Wyeth
 Brown Swiss  (1957, private collection) is one of many paintings that he made from the 1950s to the 1970s of Karl and Anna Kuerner's farm in Chadds Ford.  While the painting is named after the Brown Swiss cows Karl Kuerner owned, it shows the Kuerner farmhouse and the reflection of the house in the farm pond.  However, Wyeth ultimately decided not to include any cows in the painting; only their tracks in the grass remain.
 In 1958, Andrew and Betsy Wyeth purchased and restored "The Mill", a group of 18th-century buildings that appeared often in his work, including Night Sleeper (1979, private collection). Brinton's Mill was added to the National Register of Historic Places in 1971.
 Garret Room, a painting of Wyeth's friend Tom Clark, (1962, private collection) was begun in watercolor and finished with the drybrush technique.
 Wyeth began to add portraits in the 1960s, such as Up in the Studio (1965), a drybrush portrait of his sister Carolyn.
 In works such as The Patriot, a portrait of Ralph Cline, Wyeth looked beyond the surface to understand who he was painting. Cline was an interesting gentleman 71 years of age, of Native American heritage and Maine humor.  He wore a big hat and overalls and chewed tobacco.  It was through painting him, though, that Wyeth understood that, beneath his humor and hard countenance, Cline was a warm-hearted veteran of great dignity and intellect.
 When Christina Olson died in the winter of 1969, Wyeth refocused his artistic attention upon Siri Erickson, capturing her naked innocence in The Sauna. It was a prelude to the Helga paintings.
 Maidenhair (1974, Andrew and Betsy Wyeth collection), a tempera painting of a lone female figure sitting in a church pew at the Old German Meeting House in Waldoboro, Maine. It is a companion piece to Crown of Flowers. 
 Ring Road (1985) reflects the earth tones that Wyeth used throughout his career.
 Raven's Grove (1985) is a prime example of Wyeth's mastery of egg tempera, connecting him to long history of sacred imagery. His precise mark-making coupled with his ability to create depth through the use of finely considered details is especially palpable in this piece.

Critical reaction
Wyeth's art has long been controversial. He developed technically beautiful works, had a large following and accrued a considerable fortune as a result.  Yet critics, curators and historians have offered conflicting views about the importance of his work. Art historian Robert Rosenblum was asked in 1977 to identify the "most overrated and underrated" artists of the 20th century. He provided one name for both categories: Andrew Wyeth.

Admirers of Wyeth's art believe that his paintings, in addition to their pictorial formal beauty, contain strong emotional currents, symbolic content, and underlying abstraction. Most observers of his art agree that he is skilled at handling the medium of egg tempera (which uses egg yolk as its medium) and watercolor. Wyeth avoided using oil paints. His use of light and shadow lets the subjects illuminate the canvas. His paintings and titles suggest sound, as is implied in many paintings, including Distant Thunder (1961) and Spring Fed (1967).  Christina's World became an iconic image, a status unmet to even the best paintings, "that registers as an emotional and cultural reference point in the minds of millions."

Wyeth created work in sharp contrast to abstraction, which gained currency in American art and critical thinking in the middle of the 20th century.

Museum exhibitions of Wyeth's paintings have set attendance records, but many art critics have evaluated his work less favorably. Peter Schjeldahl, art critic for The Village Voice, derided his paintings as "Formulaic stuff, not very effective even as illustrational 'realism'." Some found Wyeth's art of rural subject matter tired and oversweet.

N.C. advised Wyeth to work from one's own perspective and imagination; to work for "effect" means the artist is not fully exploring their artistic abilities and, as a result, the artist will not realize their potential.

Museum collections
Wyeth's work is held in the following permanent collections:
 The collections of most major American museums, including the Museum of Modern Art in New York City; the National Gallery of Art; Metropolitan Museum of Art; the Whitney Museum of American Art; the Cincinnati Art Museum;  the Smithsonian American Art Museum,  the Nelson-Atkins Museum of Art in Kansas City; the Arkansas Art Center in Little Rock; and the Muscarelle Museum of Art in Williamsburg, VA. President George W. Bush and Laura Bush decorated a room of the White House in Washington, D.C. with Wyeth paintings from their collection.
 Especially large collections of the Brandywine River Museum in Chadds Ford, Pennsylvania; the Farnsworth Art Museum in Rockland, Maine; and the Greenville County Museum of Art in Greenville, South Carolina.
 Museum collections throughout the world, including the National Museum of Modern Art in Tokyo; the Hermitage Museum in St. Petersburg; the Palazzo Reale in Milan; and the Académie des Beaux Arts in Paris, among many other museums.

Honors and awards

Wyeth was the recipient of numerous honors and awards:
 2007, the National Medal of ArtsStatement on Death of Andrew Wyeth, January 16, 2009, reprinted in Weekly Compilation of Presidential Documents, Vol. 45, No 2. January 19, 2009
 1988, the Congressional Gold Medal, the highest civilian honor bestowed by the United States legislature
 1987, a D.F.A. from Bates College
 1980, the first living United States artist to be elected to Britain's Royal Academy
 1977, the first American artist since John Singer Sargent to be elected to the French Académie des Beaux-Arts
 1967, elected to the American Philosophical Society 
 1963, the first painter to receive the Presidential Medal of Freedom
 1960, elected to the American Academy of Arts and Sciences
 1947, the gold medal for painting from the American Academy of Arts and Letters

He also received numerous honorary degrees.

In popular culture
 Cartoonist Charles M. Schulz (a longtime admirer) often referred to Wyeth in his comic strip Peanuts. He even had Snoopy replace his lost Van Gogh with a Wyeth painting after his dog house burned down.
 Fred Rogers, of the PBS television series Mister Rogers' Neighborhood, had a reproduction of a Wyeth painting in the entry of the studio "home".
 Tom Duffield, the production designer for the American remake of The Ring (2002), was inspired by Wyeth's paintings for the look of the film.
M. Night Shyamalan based his movie The Village (2004) on paintings by Andrew Wyeth.
 The director Philip Ridley stated that his film The Reflecting Skin (1990) was inspired in its visual style by the paintings of Wyeth.
 The Helga series of paintings was the inspiration for the 1987 album Man of Colours by the Australian band Icehouse.
 In "Springfield Up", a 2007 episode of The Simpsons, Mr. Burns has a painting of Christina's World in his den, except he is pictured instead.
 In his autobiography Man with a Camera, cinematographer Nestor Almendros cites Wyeth as one of the inspirations for the look of the film Days of Heaven.un film de. wordpress.com  Retrieved April 21, 2011
 In the graphic novel series Preacher, issue 43 is named after the painting Christina's World. The painting is also referenced throughout the series.
 The street names of the neighborhood of Thunder Hill, in the village of Oakland Mills in the city of Columbia, Maryland, are derived from the paintings of Wyeth.
 In the 2013 film Oblivion, Christina's World is featured as the fantasy image of the world.
 Michael Palin in Wyeth's World, a BBC programme, was broadcast on 20 December 2013. Presenter Michael Palin examines the life and work of the artist.
 In 2018, PBS broadcast a documentary, as part of its American Masters series: Wyeth, on the artist's life and paintings.
On Season 9 Episode 18 of "The Real Housewives of Beverly Hills", Camille Grammer states that her Andrew Wyeth painting was among the few items that she took from her home when being evacuated during the Woolsey Fire in Southern California that burned down her house.
Episode 9 of Season 4 of Donald Glover’s TV series “Atlanta” is entitled “Andrew Wyeth. Alfred’s World.”
 In the movie War on Everyone, Jackie (Tessa Thompson's character) has a print of Christina's World hanging in her bedroom. While reflecting on the image, Terry (Alexander Skarsgård) muses "it's kinda creepy. It's like something bad is gonna happen...and there's nothing she can do about it."

See also
 Wyeth

References

Further reading
 
 
  
 
 
 
 
 
 
Anderson, Nancy K., and Brock, Charles. Andrew Wyeth: looking out, looking in. New York: Distributed Art Publishers, Inc, 2014. 

 External links 

Andrew Wyeth's website
Brandywine River Museum
Farnsworth Art Museum and Wyeth Center
AP Obituary from The Philadelphia InquirerAn account by Andrew Wyeth of his approach to painting in Life Magazine, May 14, 1965
Toward the end of his 7,500 mile horseback trek across America in 1977, William E. Marks had an interview with Andrew Wyeth that aired on MVTV exclusively and included photos of Wyeth painting en plein air.
Andrew Wyeth at MuseumSyndicate
Artnet – Andrew Wyeth
Christina's World in the MoMA Online Collection
"Faraway", an art song inspired by Wyeth's painting Faraway
Several Wyeth exhibition catalogs from The Metropolitan Museum of Art Libraries (fully available online as PDF)
Victoria Browning Wyeth discusses her family's art on Conversations from Penn State.''
Who Was Andrew Wyeth? 3 Things You Should Know About the Commonly Misunderstood Artist

 
1917 births
2009 deaths
Modern painters
American portrait painters
20th-century American painters
20th-century male artists
American male painters
American tempera painters
American watercolorists
Congressional Gold Medal recipients
Members of the American Academy of Arts and Letters
United States National Medal of Arts recipients
Wyeth family
Painters from Pennsylvania
Presidential Medal of Freedom recipients
American realist painters
People from Cushing, Maine
Honorary Members of the Royal Academy
People from Chadds Ford Township, Pennsylvania
Burials in Maine
Members of the American Philosophical Society